Thomas Hamill (4 March 1929 - 28 March 1996) was a Northern Irish association footballer. He played for Linfield F.C., and won 1 Northern Ireland B cap (1957), and 14 Irish League caps (1953–1958), and was a non-travelling member of the 1958 World Cup squad.

External links
Northern Ireland's Footballing Greats

1996 deaths
Association footballers from Northern Ireland
Linfield F.C. players
1958 FIFA World Cup players
Association football defenders
1929 births